Old Town Branch is a stream in Vernon County in the U.S. state of Missouri. It is a tributary of the Marmaton River.

Old Town Branch was named for a former Indian settlement along its course.

See also
List of rivers of Missouri

References

Rivers of Vernon County, Missouri
Rivers of Missouri